The discography of Boosie Badazz, an American rapper, consists of 13 studio albums, 7 collaboration albums, 44 mixtapes, 3 compilation albums, 1 extended play, 26 singles (including 15 singles as a featured artist), and 33 music videos.

Albums

Studio albums

Collaboration albums

Mixtapes

Compilation albums

Extended plays

Singles

As lead artist

As featured artist

Other charted songs

Guest appearances

Music videos

As lead artist

As featured artist

Notes

References

External links
 Official website
 Lil Boosie at AllMusic
 
 

Hip hop discographies
Discographies of American artists